The Carter Block is a historic mixed-use commercial building in St. Cloud, Minnesota, United States.  It was established in 1902 by businessman Wesley Carter to provide retail, office, warehousing, and meeting space in the developing city.  The Carter Block was listed on the National Register of Historic Places in 1986 for its local significance in the themes of commerce and social history.  It was nominated for encapsulating the social impact of Carter's entrepreneurship.

See also

 National Register of Historic Places listings in Stearns County, Minnesota

References

1902 establishments in Minnesota
Buildings and structures in St. Cloud, Minnesota
Commercial buildings completed in 1902
Commercial buildings on the National Register of Historic Places in Minnesota
National Register of Historic Places in Stearns County, Minnesota